Route 130 is a  state highway in the U.S. state of Massachusetts. Its southern terminus is at Route 28 in Barnstable and the northern terminus is at Route 6A in Sandwich. Along the way it intersects U.S. Route 6 (US 6) at exit 59 in Sandwich.

Route description

Route 130 begins in the Santuit section of Barnstable at Route 28 and enters Mashpee  from the terminus and travels on a north–south path through Sandwich. The highway runs through the village of Forestdale in the southern section of the town. Later it intersects with US 6 at exit 59 and then passes through the historic part of Sandwich, which includes such landmarks as the Dexter's Grist Mill, the Hoxie House, the Sandwich Glass Museum, and the Thorton W. Burgess Museum. Route 130 passes Shawme-Crowell State Forest before ending at Route 6A just before the town line with Bourne east of Sagamore.

Major intersections

References

External links

130
Transportation in Barnstable County, Massachusetts